Fuck the System is the eighth album by Scottish hardcore punk band The Exploited, released on 17 February 2003 by Dream Catcher Records. Fuck the System was available in the United States in a "clean version" with its anti-authoritarian title censored to F*** the System and edits made to the tracks themselves. The production value of this album is much higher than The Exploited's earlier work.

Controversy
On 14 October 2003 about 500 fans of the band started a riot in Montreal, Quebec, Canada after an Exploited concert was cancelled due to the band not being allowed into the country. Rioters destroyed eight cars and set them on fire; broke 11 store windows and caused other damage. The band were banned from playing in Mexico City due to the riot.

Track listing 
All songs written by Wattie Buchan, except where noted.
 "Fuck the System" – 4:15
 "Fucking Liar" – 2:34
 "Holiday in the Sun" – 2:24
 "You're a Fucking Bastard" – 2:38
 "Lie to Me" – 2:16
 "There Is No Point" – 2:05
 "Never Sell Out" (Buchan, John Duncan) – 2:35
 "Noize Annoys" – 2:06
 "I Never Changed" – 1:58
 "Why Are You Doing This to Me" – 2:25
 "Chaos Is My Life" – 2:11
 "Violent Society" – 2:14
 "Was It Me" – 4:32

Personnel
The Exploited
Wattie Buchan – vocals
Robbie "Steed" Davidson – guitar
Arthur Dalrymple – bass
Willie Buchan – drums
Technical
Produced by Russ 'Risky Russ' Russell and Simon Efemey.

References

External links
 Band personnel

The Exploited albums
2002 albums
Spitfire Records albums